Siddhipur is a village and former Village Development Committee that is now part of Mahalaxmi Municipality in Bagmati Province of central Nepal. At the time of the 2011 Nepal census it had a population of 6147 (Male: 2888; Female: 3259) living in 1484 individual households.

Siddhipur is a typical Newari community (87.49% of total population) where the spoken language is Newari (85.46% spoke Newari). The main occupation of the people living in this region is agriculture. Most of the people fully depend on the agriculture for their living. Siddhipur is also famous for sukul, which is a kind of handmade mat made of hay, a locally available material.

Location 

Education
There are many education institutions in Siddhipur .

Business/Social Organizations
There are many business or social organizations in Siddhipur.

References

External links
UN map of the municipalities of Lalitpur District
Book written about Siddhipur village.

Populated places in Lalitpur District, Nepal